Edward Joseph McManus (February 9, 1920 – March 20, 2017) served as the Lieutenant Governor of Iowa and served as a United States district judge of the United States District Court for the Northern District of Iowa for over 50 years.

Education and career

Born in Keokuk, Iowa, McManus received a Bachelor of Arts degree from the University of Iowa in 1940 and a Juris Doctor from the University of Iowa College of Law in 1942. He was a United States Naval Reserve Lieutenant from 1942 to 1946. He was in private practice in Keokuk from 1946 to 1962, serving as Keokuk City Attorney for the first nine of those years. He was elected to the Iowa Senate as a Democrat in 1954, serving from 1955 to 1959. In 1958 he was elected as the Lieutenant Governor of Iowa, a position he held from 1959 to 1961 serving under Governor Herschel C. Loveless. He was the Democratic nominee for Governor of Iowa in 1960, losing to Norman A. Erbe in November 1960. He was President of the Coca-Cola Bottling Company in Keokuk from 1955 to 1962 and President of 1001 Corporation in Keokuk from 1960 to 1962.

Federal judicial service

McManus was nominated by President John F. Kennedy on June 23, 1962 to a seat on the United States District Court for the Northern District of Iowa vacated when Judge Henry N. Graven assumed senior status. He was confirmed by the United States Senate on July 13, 1962, and received his commission on July 16, 1962. He had not lived in the Northern District until this appointment, and thus needed to relocate from Keokuk (in Iowa's far southeastern county) to Cedar Rapids, Iowa.  He served as Chief Judge from 1962 to 1985. He assumed senior status on February 9, 1985. No federal district court judge in Iowa history served for a longer period on the bench than McManus. He died at the age of 97 on March 20, 2017, in Cedar Rapids; at the time of his death, McManus was the longest serving living federal judge.

See also
 List of United States federal judges by longevity of service

References

Sources
 

1920 births
2017 deaths
Democratic Party Iowa state senators
Lieutenant Governors of Iowa
Judges of the United States District Court for the Northern District of Iowa
United States district court judges appointed by John F. Kennedy
20th-century American judges
21st-century American judges
University of Iowa alumni
University of Iowa College of Law alumni
People from Keokuk, Iowa
United States Navy officers
Coca-Cola people
Businesspeople from Iowa
20th-century American businesspeople
20th-century American politicians